Slave Riot is a jazz and fusion music album by Oxnard-based hip hop producer Madlib's Jazz virtual band Young Jazz Rebels. It's a group of fictional members all created by Madlib. It was released on March 23, 2010 on Stones Throw Records in vinyl and CD format.

Track list
 "Ancestors" - 1:42
 "The Legend Of Mankind" - 2:12
 "The Wind" - 2:17
 "Forces Unseen" - 2:22
 "On The Run From Mr. Charlie" - 3:17
 "The Sun" - 3:13
 "Hate/Love" - 2:30
 "Newear" - 2:41
 "Theme From Illusion Suite" - 2:00
 "Primal Sound (The Moon)" - 1:23
 "Nappy Headed History" - 3:14
 "Young Day (Short Version)" - 2:26
 "For Brother Sun Ra" - 2:26
 "Hope" - 0:41
 "Nino's Deeds (Alternate Take)" - 2:52
 "Slave Riots (Parts 1-3, Before)" - 6:38
 "Slave Riots (Parts 4-6, After)" - 7:01
 "Black Freedom" - 4:04

Personnel
Credits adopted for Discogs.

 Project Coordinator - Eothen "Egon" Alapatt
 Design - Jeff Jank
 Executive Producer - Peanut Butter Wolf
 Featuring - Brother Dave L, Juggy Lewis, Lamont Parker, Lena Hamilton, Mary Jane (9), Melvin Hampson, Monk Hughes, Tyrone Crumb
 Mastered By - Kelly Hibbert
 Producer - Madlib
 Written-By - Melvin Hampson (tracks: 3, 14)
 Written-By - Monk Hughes (tracks: 1, 6, 12, 18)
 Written-By - Stanley Cowell (tracks: 9)
 Written-By - Young Jazz Rebels (tracks: 2, 4, 5, 7, 8, 10, 11, 13, 15, 16, 17)

References

2010 albums
Madlib albums
Stones Throw Records albums